Souls in Pawn is a 1940 American drama film directed by Melville Shyer and featuring Kenne Duncan, Lloyd Ingraham, Symona Boniface. It was produced by the independent producer Willis Kent.

Synopsis
A young woman is secretly married to a college student and falls pregnant. However he refuses to support the child and so after giving birth she agrees to give it up for adoption. It is then adopted by a burlesque queen as part of a publicity stunt.

Cast
 Ginger Britton as Nan Carey
 Beatrice Curtis as Lois Saunders
 Kenne Duncan as J.W. Carlton
 Lloyd Ingraham as 	Dr. Ingram
 Richard Beach as 	Bill Saunders
 Patti Lacey as 	Patsy
 Evelyn Mulhall as 	Manager of 'The Haven'
 Symona Boniface as 	Nurse at 'The Manger'
 Donald Kerr as 	Nan's P.R. Man
 Jimmy Aubrey as 	Motel Manager
 Ethelreda Leopold as 	The Hitch-hiker
 Richard Lee Spitz as 	Baby Bill

References

Bibliography
 Pitts, Michael R. Poverty Row Studios, 1929–1940. McFarland & Company, 2005.

External links
 

1940 films
1940 drama films
American drama films
American black-and-white films
Films directed by Melville Shyer
1940s English-language films
1940s American films